The Rivers State Tourism Development Agency (abbreviated : RSTDA) is an agency of the Government of Rivers State in Nigeria.  It is responsible for promoting and improving sustainable tourism activities and attractions in the state. Established in January 2012, the agency's mission is to initiate partnerships with local and international tourism, cultural and development agencies with a view to maximize the tourism potentials in Rivers State and meet best global practices.

The RSTDA has its headquarters in D-line, Port Harcourt. The current Director-General is Mr Yibo Koko.

See also
Carniriv
Rivers State Ministry of  Culture and Tourism
Music of Port Harcourt

References

External links
Official website

D-line, Port Harcourt
Government agencies and parastatals of Rivers State
Organizations based in Port Harcourt
Tourism agencies
Government agencies established in 2012
Tourism in Rivers State
2012 establishments in Nigeria
2010s establishments in Rivers State